In kinematics, Chasles' theorem, or Mozzi–Chasles' theorem, says that the most general rigid body displacement can be produced by a translation along a line (called its screw axis or Mozzi axis) followed (or preceded) by a rotation about an axis parallel to that line.

History
The proof that a spatial displacement can be decomposed into a rotation and slide around and along a line is attributed to the astronomer and mathematician Giulio Mozzi (1763), in fact the screw axis is traditionally called asse di Mozzi in Italy. However, most textbooks refer to a subsequent similar work by Michel Chasles dating from 1830. Several other contemporaries of M. Chasles obtained the same or similar results around that time, including G. Giorgini, Cauchy, Poinsot, Poisson and Rodrigues.  An account of the 1763 proof by Giulio Mozzi and some of its history can be found here.

Proof
Mozzi considers a rigid body undergoing first a rotation about an axis passing through the center of mass and then a translation of displacement D in an arbitrary direction. Any rigid motion can be accomplished in this way due to a theorem by Euler on the existence of an axis of rotation. 
The displacement D of the center of mass can be decomposed into components parallel and perpendicular to the axis. The perpendicular (and parallel) component acts on all points of the rigid body but Mozzi shows that for some points the previous rotation acted exactly with an opposite displacement, so those points are translated parallel to the axis of rotation. These points lie on the Mozzi axis through which the rigid motion can be accomplished through a screw motion.

Another elementary proof of Mozzi–Chasles' theorem was given by E. T. Whittaker in 1904. Suppose A is to be transformed into B. Whittaker suggests that line AK be selected parallel to the axis of the given rotation, with K the foot of a perpendicular from B. The appropriate screw displacement is about an axis parallel to AK such that K is moved to B. The method corresponds to Euclidean plane isometry where a composition of rotation and translation can be replaced by rotation about an appropriate center. In Whittaker's terms, "A rotation about any axis is equivalent to a rotation through the same angle about any axis parallel to it, together with a simple translation in a direction perpendicular to the axis."

Calculation 
The calculation of the commuting translation and rotation from a screw motion can be performed using 3DPGA, the geometric algebra of 3D Euclidean space. It has three Euclidean basis vectors  satisfying  representing orthogonal planes through the origin, and one Grassmanian basis vector  satisfying  to represent the plane at infinity. Any plane a distance  from the origin can then be formed as a linear combination which is normalized such that . The result is a rotation around their intersection line , which could also lie on the plane at infinity when the two reflections are parallel, in which case the bireflection  is a translation.

A screw motion  is the product of four non-collinear reflections, and thus . But according to the Mozzi-Chasles' theorem a screw motion can be decomposed into a commuting translation where  is the axis of translation satisfying , and rotationwhere  is the axis of rotation satisfying .

References

Further reading
 Benjamin Peirce (1872) A System of Analytical Mechanics, III. Combined Motions of Rotation and Translation, especially § 32 and § 39, David van Nostrand & Company, link from Internet Archive

Mathematical theorems
Kinematics
Euclidean solid geometry
Rotation in three dimensions